Lytocaryum is a monoecious genus of flowering plant in the palm family endemic to the Atlantic coast of Brazil, where 4 species are known.  Palms once classified as Microcoelum are herein included; the genus is closely related to Syagrus, from which it is differentiated only by abundant tomentum, strongly versatile anthers, and slight epicarp, mesocarp, and endocarp differences.  The name is Greek for "loose" and "nut".

Species accepted:

 Lytocaryum hoehnei (Burret) Toledo - São Paulo
 Lytocaryum insigne (Rob.) Toledo - Espírito Santo, Rio de Janeiro
 Lytocaryum itapebiense Noblick & Lorenzi - Bahia
 Lytocaryum weddellianum (H.Wendl.) Toledo - Rio de Janeiro

Description
Both species are solitary trunked, closely ringed and retain leaf sheaths at the top of the stem.  The trunks reach 15 cm in diameter to 4.5 m in height, but are usually just half that in cultivation.  The spherical leaf crown consists of numerous pinnate leaves to 75 cm long on hairy, 30 cm petioles.  The pinnae are 12 cm long, closely and regularly arranged along the rachis, in the same plane, green on top with gray, glaucous undersides.

The inflorescence is interfoliar and once branched, covered in brown hair, with unisexual flowers of both sexes. The female flowers are twice as big as the male's, both with three sepals and three petals. The fruit is globose to ellipsoidal, pink to red, with one seed.

Distribution and habitat
In southern Brazil, L. hoehnei is confined to a patch of mountainous forest between 800 and 975 m of elevation, in nearly year-round rain; there it is almost extinct.  L. weddellianum is found on Brazil's southeastern coast where development has also caused it to become endangered.  It grows in rain forest to 900 m in elevation; both are restricted to filtered light and humus-rich soil.

Cultivation and uses
Lytocaryum weddellianum is a commonly potted plant throughout Europe which may save it from extinction, but L. hoehnei is essentially unknown in cultivation.  The former demands shade and rich, friable, quickly draining soil with some acidity; the latter would likely require the same if cultivated.

References

External links
 Lytocaryum on NPGS/GRIN
 GBIF portal
 Fairchild Guide to Palms: Lytocaryum 
 Images at DivesityofLife.org
 IPNI Listing
 Kew Plant List

Cocoseae
Endemic flora of Brazil
Arecaceae genera